The Prag Cine Awards 2013 ceremony, presented by the Prag Network, honored the actors, technical achievements, and films censored in 2012 from Assam and took place on April 14, 2013, at the GMCH Auditorium in Guwahati, India. Bollywood director Kalpana Lajmi, actors Pooja Bhatt, Adil Hussain were present at the event while veteran Assamese actor Pranjal Saikia and Zerifa Wahid hosted the show.

Actor Biju Phukan was honoured with the lifetime Achievement Award for his contribution towards the Assamese film Industry.
Kapil Bora and Barsha Rani Bishaya won respectively Best Actor Male and Best Actor Female awards for their performance in Dwaar and Me & My Sister. Jahnu Barua directed Baandhon won the Best Film award.

Winners and nominees 
The winners in 23 categories of the Prag Cine Awards 2013 were selected among the thirteen films censored from Assam in the year 2012. It includes 11 Assamese and 2 non-Assamese films (one each English and Mishing film). Dwaar begged highest number of awards including Best Director, Best Actor Male, and Best Music. The jury members for this selection were Sanjib Hazarika, Moloya Goswami, JP Das, Munin Bayan, and Sibanan Barua.

Awards 

Winners are listed first and highlighted in boldface.

Lifetime achievement award
Veteran actor Biju Phukan was honoured with the lifetime Achievement Award for his contribution towards the Assamese film Industry. This award consists of a cash prize of 50,000 along with a trophy and a citation.

Other awards 
 Best Critic: Arun Lochan Das
 Jury's Special Mention:
Adhyay
Manash Hazarika – Aakash Suboloi Mon

See also 
List of Assamese films of the 2010s

References

Cinema of Assam
2012 Indian film awards